The Legend of King Arthur is a British television fantasy serial, produced by the BBC in association with Time-Life Television and the Australian Broadcasting Commission, and broadcast on BBC 1 in 1979.

Plot

Cast
Andrew Burt as King Arthur
Felicity Dean as Guinevere
Maureen O'Brien as Morgan le Fay
David Robb as Lancelot
Geoffrey Bateman as Gawain
James Simmons as Galahad
Robert Eddison as Merlin
Patsy Kensit as the young Morgan

Production
Earnestly historicist, the production design of the show was of the heroic age, ca. A.D. 500, like the HTV production Arthur of the Britons (1972–3). However, the tragic storyline of this BBC version kept closer faith with the chivalric romance of Le Morte d'Arthur.

Reception
The Arthurian scholar Norris J. Lacy opines: "The Legend of King Arthur  has the leisure to depict the legend in detail, but the resulting periodic presentation, if not the medium itself, dilutes the force and drama of the Arthurian story in a way that rarely happens in literature, and certainly not either in the French Vulgate or in Malory."

Novelisation
A tie-in novel, The Legend of King Arthur, authored by the screenwriter Andrew Davies, was published in London by Fontana/Armada in 1979.

Home video and DVD releases
The serial was released on VHS by BBC Video in 1985, and on DVD by Simply Media in 2016.

See also
List of films based on Arthurian legend

References

External links
 

1970s British drama television series
BBC television dramas
1979 British television series debuts
1979 British television series endings
British fantasy television series
Television series based on Arthurian legend
Period television series
English-language television shows